This is a list of footballers notable  for their contributions to Livingston F.C. since their change from Meadowbank Thistle in 1995, players who played under Meadowbank Thistle and continued to after the change are included.  It generally includes only players who made more than 100 league appearances for the club, but some players with fewer than 100 appearances are also included. This includes players who represented their national team while with the club, and players who have set a club record, such as most appearances, most goals or biggest transfer fee.

Notable players 

Bold type indicates that the player currently plays for the club.

Key to positions
 GK — Goalkeeper
 DF — Defender
 MF — Midfielder
 FW — Forward

Notes

References

External links 

Players
 
Livingston
Association football player non-biographical articles
Players